Alvania suroiti is a species of minute sea snail, a marine gastropod mollusc or micromollusc in the family Rissoidae.

Description

Distribution
This species is found on the Great Meteor and Hyères seamounts in the North Atlantic, commonly at a depth of 330–480 m.

References

Rissoidae
Gastropods described in 2007